Margaret Ann Wallace (January 18, 1947 – May 31, 2020) was an American businesswoman and politician who served as a member of the Utah House of Representatives.

Background 
Wallace was born in Salt Lake City, Utah. She went to the University of Utah and Westminster College. Prior to entering politics, she worked in the credit union business. Wallace served in the Utah House of Representatives from 2001 to 2007 as a Republican.

Notes

1943 births
2020 deaths
Businesspeople from Salt Lake City
Politicians from Salt Lake City
University of Utah alumni
Westminster College (Utah) alumni
Women state legislators in Utah
Republican Party members of the Utah House of Representatives
21st-century American women